The Chance of a Lifetime is a 1943 crime drama starring Chester Morris, Erik Rolf and Jeanne Bates.  It is one of 14 films made by Columbia Pictures involving detective Boston Blackie, a criminal-turned-crime solver. This was the sixth in the series and one of three that did not have his name in the title.  The film is also William Castle's directorial debut. As with many of the films of the period, this was a flag waver to support America's efforts during World War II.

The film is under copyright until 2039 due to renewal.

Plot
Boston Blackie (Chester Morris) helps get prisoners with needed skills released on parole to help in the machine and tool plant of his friend, Arthur Manleder (Lloyd Corrigan). Those chosen want to support America's war effort. All of the parolees have to stay in Blackie's apartment, all except robber Dooley Watson. Blackie allows him to see his wife and son.

Watson goes after the payroll money he stole before he was captured. His wife Mary (Jeanne Bates) convinces him to give it back, but his partners in crime, "Red" Taggart (John Harmon) and "Nails" Blanton (Douglas Fowley), have been waiting patiently for their share. When they threaten Dooley's family, Dooley fights back. Red is killed in the ensuing struggle. Nails runs off. If Boston Blackie is to save his project, he has to capture Nails and force him to confess the death was in self-defense, all while dodging Inspector Farraday (Richard Lane).

Cast
 Chester Morris as Boston Blackie
 Erik Rolf as Dooley Watson
 Jeanne Bates as Mary Watson
 Richard Lane as Inspector John Farraday
 George E. Stone as The Runt
 Lloyd Corrigan as Arthur Manleder

Uncredited:
 Arthur Hunnicutt as Elwood "Tex" Stewart
 Pierre Watkin as Gov. Rutledge
 Douglas Fowley as "Nails" Blanton
 Sid Melton as "Sunny" Hines
 Walter Sande as Detective Sgt. Mathews
 Harry Semels as Jerome "Egypt" Hines
 Ray Teal as Joe, a cop
 Marie De Becker as Miss Bailey
 Minta Durfee

Production
William Castle wanted to direct. Harry Cohn gave him the chance with this film. Castle said it was a "lousy, dull, contrived, miserable script; the characters wooden and the dialogue unbelievably bad. My first picture and I had a turkey!"

He tried to arrange for the script to be rewritten but Irving Briskin refused and Castle was too scared to ask Cohn for a rewrite. The film was shot in twelve days. Castle says Chester Morris "tried to breathe some life into a part that died at birth" and Bates "hopelessly tried to play the femme fetale".

Castle said Briskin disliked the film and rearranged its structure with extensive cutting making it, in Castle's words, "even more muddled and screwed up than it had been originally."

Reception
Reviews of the film were terrible but Castle says Cohn backed him and gave him another movie to direct, The Whistler, which was a success.

References

Notes

External links
 
 
 
 

1943 crime drama films
1943 films
American crime drama films
American black-and-white films
Columbia Pictures films
1943 directorial debut films
Films directed by William Castle
World War II films made in wartime
Boston Blackie films